The Ball State Cardinals are the athletic teams that represent Ball State University, located in Muncie, Indiana. The Cardinals are part of the NCAA Division I Mid-American Conference. Charlie Cardinal is the team mascot.

The Ball State University Pride of Mid-America Marching Band performs at all home football games, many home basketball games, and various other athletic and spirit events across campus.

Nickname 

Ball State athletics teams adopted the nickname Cardinals in 1927, after the name was suggested by then-athletic director Paul "Billy" Williams and voted upon by the student body.  In years prior, the school's teams were known as the Hoosieroons.

Sports sponsored 

A member of the West Division of the Mid-American Conference (MAC), Ball State sponsors teams in seven men's and 12 women's NCAA sanctioned sports. The men's volleyball team is a member of the Midwestern Intercollegiate Volleyball Association.

Football 

The Ball State Cardinals compete in Division I Football Bowl Subdivision and the Mid-American Conference. The current head coach is Mike Neu.  The Cardinals play at Scheumann Stadium. On October 5, 2008, Ball State was ranked in the Associated Press Top 25 poll for the first time in team history, and reached a ranking as high as 12th in the nation during the course of the season. Ball State completed the 2008 regular season with a record of 12–0 and a conference record of 8–0. They won the MAC West Division championship before falling to Buffalo in the MAC Championship at Ford Field in Detroit. Shortly after the departure of head coach Brady Hoke, Ball State lost to the University of Tulsa in the GMAC Bowl on January 6, 2009 by a score of 45–13.

Bowl games
The Cardinals have gone to eight Division I bowl games. They have a 1–8 record in these games, with their last appearance being a 51-20 loss to Georgia State in the Camellia Bowl.

Women's basketball

The Ball State Cardinals' women's basketball team won their first MAC tournament in 2009 and subsequently went to their first-ever NCAA Tournament. In the first round, they beat the Tennessee Lady Volunteers 71–55 in Bowling Green, Kentucky. 12th-seeded Ball State's win over 5th-seeded Tennessee was the Lady Volunteers' first first-round loss in the 28-year history of the women's NCAA Tournament. The Cardinals earned a lot of attention for their historic first round win and briefly became the Cinderella, feel-good story of the NCAA Tournament before losing to the Iowa State Cyclones 57–71 in the second round.  On March 21, 2012, head coach Kelly Packard resigned  On May 12, 2012, Brady Sallee, the former coach at Eastern Illinois University, was named the eleventh head coach in the program's history.

Baseball

The Ball State baseball team plays in the MAC West Division. They play on Ball Diamond. Their head coach is Rich Maloney, who formerly coached the Cardinals, with an extended stint with the University of Michigan in between. The team began play in 1918. The Cardinals have had 8 players drafted in the first round of the Major League Baseball Draft. Their most notable alumni though is Mr. Jonny Cisna, the inventor of the term launch angle.

Softball
Ball State's softball team has appeared in two Women's College World Series, in 1973 and 1975.

Fight song 

The Ball State fight song was written by Carl Hofer in 1930.

References

External links